Euphemia de Walliers (1100s – 26 April 1257) was a Benedictine nun of Flemish descent who became the abbess of Wherwell Abbey. She is known for building and rebuilding at the abbey whilst the number of nuns rose by 40 to 80 during her management.

Life
Her mother was Margaret de Walliers and her father is considered to be Theodore de Walliers although her birthplace and birthday are unknown. In 1212 she was a nun at Wherwell Abbey when her aunt, Matilda de Bailleul, died. Her aunt had been the abbess and de Walliers was elected as her replacement. She became head of an abbey with four prebends with forty nuns and she was also given a psalter which had belonged to her predecessor. The Saint Bertin psalter is still extant and Euphemia was the second abbess to add annotation and details to it. This is why the name of her mother is known and her father's name can be implied.

Her predecessor, Maud/Matilda de Bailleul, had reestablished the abbey after it was burned during the Anarchy in 1141. de Walliers devoted her time to reconstructing buildings.

Euphemia seems to have been a veritable whirlwind. As the surviving cartulary records. Euphemia built a new farmery, dorter and latrines with running water, all away from the main buildings, and nearby a chapel of the Blessed Virgin, with a large enclosed garden. By the river bank, she constructed other buildings leaving access to the river for the nuns. She cleared older buildings and built a new hall for the manor court, and further away a new efficient mill. She completely rebuilt the dilapidated manor house at Middleton, and she took similar measures at Tufton. She was attentive to charitable works and in providing hospitality.

She embellished the Norman church that had replaced the original Saxon church with crosses, reliquaries, precious stones, vestments, and books. When the decaying bell tower collapsed on to the dorter in the early hours, narrowly missing the nuns, she built a tall and handsome replacement that matched the remaining buildings and in her old age she had dismantled and rebuilt with 12-foot deep foundations the sanctuary of the church.

Death and legacy
She died on 26 April 1257 and it is presumed that she was buried in the Abbey's church. de Walliers had added details of her relatives' obituaries and prayers to the psalter given to her by her predecessor, Matilda. The psalter continued to be passed down and it is now in St John's College, Cambridge.

References

1100s births
1257 deaths
Benedictine abbesses
English Roman Catholic abbesses
13th-century English women
13th-century English people